Gregory Joseph Carvel (born August 17, 1970) is an American former NCAA ice hockey player. He is currently the head coach for the UMass Minutemen of the Hockey East conference. Carvel has been a head coach at St Lawrence University and an assistant coach in the National Hockey League (NHL) with both the Anaheim Ducks and Ottawa Senators.

Career
Greg Carvel is a graduate of St. Lawrence University, having played four years for the ice hockey program. After a short professional career Carvel became an assistant coach and progressed from high school through college and into the NHL as an assistant. After working for the Ottawa Senators for six seasons Carvel returned to college to work as an assistant under his former coach, Joe Marsh, for one campaign before Marsh retired. Carvel took over the program at his alma mater, getting the team to two conference semifinals and earning a Tim Taylor Award in four years.

UMass
In 2016 Carvel left St. Lawrence to take over at Massachusetts where the program had fallen on hard times since the retirement of Don Cahoon. After a terrible 5-win season his first year Carvel got the Minutemen to post 17 wins in year two, their highest total since 2010. after the season Carvel was given a contract extension through the 2022-23 season. The following year, with eventual Hobey Baker Award winner Cale Makar leading the way, Carvel's team posted the best record in the history of the program. UMass won 31 games as well as their first Hockey East regular season title and made it all the way to the National Championship Game.

On April 10, 2021, Carvel's UMass team won the national title, defeating St. Cloud State 5-0.

Head coaching record

References

External links
 Official Biography, UMass Minutemen
 

1970 births
Living people
American ice hockey coaches
Anaheim Ducks coaches
Anaheim Ducks scouts
Ottawa Senators coaches
People from Canton, New York
St. Lawrence Saints men's ice hockey coaches
St. Lawrence Saints men's ice hockey players
UMass Minutemen ice hockey coaches
Ice hockey coaches from New York (state)
Pittsburgh Penguins draft picks
American men's ice hockey forwards
Ice hockey players from New York (state)
National Hockey League supplemental draft picks